NOTE: This organization doesn't seem to exist anymore, the http://www.ohanda.org/ URL has been found to be inactive in January 2023. 

The Open Hardware and Design Alliance (OHANDA) aims at encouraging the sharing of open hardware and designs. The core of the project is a free online service where manufacturers of Open hardware and designs can register their products with a common label. This label maps the four freedoms of Free Software to physical devices and their documentation. It is similar to a non-registered trademark for hardware and can be compared to other certificates such as U.S. Federal Communications Commission (FCC) or CE mark. OHANDA thus has the role of a self-organized registration authority.

License 

The Open Hardware and Design Alliance has rewritten the four freedoms of free software as follows to match them to hardware resp. hardware documentation:

The idea to create a label that makes open hardware and designs recognizable is because copyright and copyleft are hard to realize in the context of physical devices. Instead of going through the lengthy and expensive process of patenting hardware to make it open, hardware developers and designers can put their products under a public domain license by registering them on the OHANDA website. They can license their work under their own names and keep the devices' reuse open.

The procedure is the following: A hardware designer or manufacturer creates an account on the OHANDA website to get a unique producer ID. This account can either be for a person or for an organization. The terms and conditions he accepts to use the label imply that she grants the Four Freedoms to the users. The documentation of the product must be published under a "copyleft" or public domain license. Next, the manufacturer registers the product or design. A unique product ID will be issued. This ID is also referred to as the "OKEY". Now the manufacturer or designer can print or engrave the OHANDA label and the OKEY onto the device. This way, the device always carries the link to the open documentation and to all past contributors. Via the OHANDA website, users can trace back the artefact. At the same time, the label makes the openness of the product visible. Everyone is free to change the device and to share the new design with a new product ID on the website. The development can be seen by following the associations online.

Development 
The idea of creating a label for open source hardware came up at the GOSH! Summit (Grounding Open Source Hardware) at Banff Centre in Banff, Alberta in July 2009. Since then, the active community members developed the project website where OHANDA-labeled hardware can be registered. OHANDA launched a sticker campaign: The stickers show a crossed out closed box, symbolizing closed "black boxes". The stickers are meant to be put on all sorts of devices to make visible how little open source devices exist.

In 2011, OHANDA community members met at the Piksel11 festival in Bergen/Norway. Since then, they have been using the term "reables" as a replacement for "Free/Libre Open Source Hardware".

See also 

Open hardware
List of open source hardware projects
Commons-based peer production
DIY
Electronic design automation
Engineers Without Borders
Free content
Free software
Graphics hardware and FOSS
Open Compute Project
Open content
Open design – Open-source physical design with a wider focus
Open source
Open Source Ecology – Free farming machines
Open-source robotics
Open Source Appropriate Technology – open-source hardware specifically focusing on appropriate technology for sustainable development
Open-source software
Patent
Peer production

References

External links 
Open Hardware And Design Alliance - Project Website
OHANDA: List of registered products
GOSH! Summit 2009
 Bas van Abel/Roel Klaassen/Lucas Evers/Peter Troxler (ed.): Open Design Now, BIS publishers, Amsterdam, 2011 Online version of Open Design Now, CC BY-NC-SA-3.0 licensed

 
Free content
Free software
Design